Kuripuni is a suburb of Masterton, a town on New Zealand's North Island.

It has a sports bar, a medical centre, and a post shop.

The Kuripuni Village was redeveloped during the 2010s. The Kuripuni Bookshop, which operated between 1996 and 2018, was the last of the original stores to close.

Demographics 

Kuripuni had a population of 1,653 at the 2018 New Zealand census, an increase of 15 people (0.9%) since the 2013 census, and an increase of 72 people (4.6%) since the 2006 census. There were 651 households. There were 789 males and 861 females, giving a sex ratio of 0.92 males per female. The median age was 45.7 years (compared with 37.4 years nationally), with 306 people (18.5%) aged under 15 years, 252 (15.2%) aged 15 to 29, 696 (42.1%) aged 30 to 64, and 396 (24.0%) aged 65 or older.

Ethnicities were 88.0% European/Pākehā, 18.1% Māori, 3.1% Pacific peoples, 3.6% Asian, and 1.8% other ethnicities (totals add to more than 100% since people could identify with multiple ethnicities).

The proportion of people born overseas was 13.6%, compared with 27.1% nationally.

Although some people objected to giving their religion, 51.5% had no religion, 37.7% were Christian, 0.4% were Hindu, 0.2% were Muslim, 0.5% were Buddhist and 2.2% had other religions.

Of those at least 15 years old, 231 (17.1%) people had a bachelor or higher degree, and 294 (21.8%) people had no formal qualifications. The median income was $26,200, compared with $31,800 nationally. The employment status of those at least 15 was that 579 (43.0%) people were employed full-time, 192 (14.3%) were part-time, and 57 (4.2%) were unemployed.

Education

Masterton's first school

The only school within the Masterton borough until 1909 when Lansdowne School opened (that school closed in 2004) it was founded in 1865 as Masterton West School. The attendance fees were a shilling a week in spite of a state subsidy. In 1866 they had 11 boys and 9 girls in one room on the Upper Plain opposite the current Fernridge School. Masterton's first State School was founded in 1877 using premises in Dixon Street near the site of the current courthouse and the close by park for playgrounds. The roll was 389 pupils in 1881. These arrangements were soon replaced by Masterton Central School in Kuripuni which opened on 6 February 1882.  The site was sandwiched between Queen and Chapel Streets taking more than 5 acres, the northern half of the block bounded by Kuripuni Street and Russell Street where it met the education reserve that would also become for a while the grounds of Wairarapa College and St Joseph's, St Patrick's and the Convent. 

It became Masterton District High School in 1884 after adding classes in mathematics, Latin and French but there were insufficient secondary pupils and after 15 months it reverted to being Central. The High School status returned for 21 years in March 1902. In March 1923 the new Wairarapa High School opened taking away the secondary department. The primary department resumed the name Masterton Central School until 2004 (when Harley Street School was closed and merged in) and the word Central was replaced with Primary.

In the 1960s it was recognised the buildings needed to be renewed but, positioned across the entrance to town, the school's generous site had become commercially valuable. The school's move to 53 South Road was completed at the end of 1970 and Kuripuni's triangle began to take on a quite different style and appearance. Most of the school's 1960s South Road buildings were replaced in 2004.

It was a greenfield development of the late 1950s.

It was founded in 1978.

References

Suburbs of Masterton